Kathy Tyers is an American science fiction author.

Biography
Kathy Tyers Gillin (née Moore) was born and raised in Long Beach, California. She obtained a degree in microbiology from Montana State University, where she met her first husband, Mark Tyers. After their marriage, she returned to school and became certified to teach grades K-12. When their church opened a private school, she took over teaching the lower grades. In 1979, she retired from teaching to start a family; her son Matthew was born in 1981, and she began writing in earnest two years later.

Tyers published her first novel, Firebird, with Bantam Spectra in 1986. She subsequently published Fusion Fire (1988; a sequel to Firebird), Crystal Witness (1989) and Shivering World (1991). During this period she also authored a nonfiction travel book and, with her husband, released two CDs of folk music, Leave Her, Johnny and The Very Best Dreams on which she played flute and Irish harp. In 1991, while working on another speculative fiction novel, she was approached with an opportunity to write a novel in the Star Wars Expanded Universe. Her novel, The Truce at Bakura (1993), reached the New York Times bestseller list.

Despite her success, after the sale of her novel, One Mind's Eye, Tyers took a complete sabbatical from writing from 1994 to 1997. She eventually returned to writing, specifically targeting the Christian Booksellers Association in an attempt to sell Christian science fiction, and Bethany House Publishers published rewritten versions of Firebird and Fusion Fire.

The rewritten versions, published in 1999 and 2000 along with a third novel, Crown of Fire, were much more spiritual in nature and, in most markets, were marketed as Christian fiction instead of science fiction. They were published as a single volume edition in 2004. During the same period, Tyers was approached for the Star Wars market again and authored another novel, Balance Point, in addition to short stories for four Star Wars anthologies. Shivering World was revised and re-released in early 2004.

Tyers' husband, Mark, died from alcoholism in 2004. She took another sabbatical from fiction writing, working with guitarist Christopher Parkening on his autobiography Grace Like a River. In 2006, she entered Regent College in Vancouver, British Columbia, and after earning a Master of Christian Studies degree, she lived in Bellingham, Washington for a year before returning to Montana.

The three Firebird novels were re-released in an annotated version by Marcher Lord Press in 2011, followed by two additional series novels: Wind and Shadow in 2011 and Daystar in 2012, completing the Firebird Saga.

Tyers remarried in 2014 and is active in the Presbyterian (PCA) church.

Bibliography
 Firebird (1987, revised 1999 and 2011)
 Fusion Fire (1988, revised 2000 and 2011)
 Crystal Witness (1989)
 Exploring the Northern Rockies (1991, travel)
 Shivering World (1991, revised 2004)
 The Truce at Bakura (1993) (Part of the Star Wars fictional universe)
 "We Don't Do Weddings" in Tales from the Mos Eisley Cantina (1995) (Part of the Star Wars fictional universe)
 "A Time to Dance, A Time to Mourn: Oola's Tale" in Tales from Jabba's Palace (1996) (Part of the Star Wars fictional universe)
 "The Prize Pelt: Bossk's Tale" in Tales of the Bounty Hunters (1996) (Part of the Star Wars fictional universe)
 One Mind's Eye (1996)
 "Tinian on Trial" in Tales From the Empire (1997) (Part of the Star Wars fictional universe)
 Balance Point (2000) (Part of the Star Wars fictional universe)
 Crown of Fire (2000)
 Firebird: A Trilogy  (2004)
 "Their New Masters" in Eat My Martian Dust, (2005)
 Grace Like a River (2006, biography)
 The Annotated Firebird (2011)
 Wind and Shadow (2011)
 Daystar (2012)

Discography
 Leave Her, Johnny (1986)
 The Very Best Dreams'' (1988)

References

External links
 Kathy Tyers's website
 
 Interview with Kathy Tyers

American Presbyterians
Living people
Montana State University alumni
People from Greater Los Angeles
American writers
American flautists
American harpists
People from Bozeman, Montana
People from Long Beach, California
1952 births